The Cape Verde women's national handball team is the national team of Cape Verde. It is governed by the Federaçao Caboverdiana de Andebol and takes part in international handball competitions.

African Championship record
2021 – 9th place
2022 – 12th place

References

External links
IHF profile

Women's national handball teams
Handball
National team